Otto Müller (November 21, 1898 – December 9, 1979) was a German painter and graphic designer.

Life and work

Parental home 

Müller was born on November 21, 1898 in Cröllwitz, which since 1900 was a part of the city of Halle, Saxony-Anhalt. He was the first child of the engine driver Karl Christoph Friedrich Otto Müller (1874–1951) and Anna Müller, née Schmidt (1876–1923). He had one brother and two sisters. As a child, Müller spent a considerable amount of time with his paternal grandmother in Halle-Trotha.

Education 
Müller went to school in Halle for eight years, after which his father expected him to start an apprenticeship as an electrician. He was rejected however on account of his small stature and went on instead to train as a lithographer from 1913 to 1917. During this period, he also attended evening classes in drawing and painting at the Staatliche Städtische Handwerkerschule, later known as the Kunstgewerbeschule Burg Giebichenstein (Burg Giebichstein Academy of Arts and Crafts, in Halle.

During the First World War in 1918, Müller was called up to serve in the 18th Foot Artillery Regiment Kirchenhain on the Western Front in France. Marked by his experiences during this time, he became a pacifist and remained so for the rest of his life. Showing something of a Schwejkian streak, Müller often took to drawing when on duty, and he was soon given the task of looking after the regimental horses.

After being demobilised in 1919, he started studying painting at the Burg Giebichenstein Academy of Arts and Crafts, where he was a student of Professor Erwin Hahs (1887–1970). During this period, he formed strong and lasting friendships with fellow students Paul Zilling (1900–1953) and Helmut Schröder (1910–1974). In 1927, both Müller and Helmut Schröder joined a class taught by Charles Crodel, newly appointed to Burg Giebichstein as professor for painting and graphics. During his time in Charles Crodel's class, Müller befriended Kurt Bunge (1911–1998). In different ways, Erwin Hahs and Charles Crodel both influenced Müller's artistic development. Encouraged by both of these teachers, Müller came to see a precise study of nature as the basis for all artistic work. Müller is also indebted to Erwin Hahs for training his formal means of expression in terms of a constructive composition encompassing abstract art. At the same time, he preferred Charles Crodel's practical approach to Erwin Hahs’ more theoretical teaching methods. With his practical approach, Crodel would encouraged his students to develop their own individual style while observing them at work. Loosely composed, often highly colourful and reminiscent of impressionism, Crodel's paintings provided Müller with fresh artistic impetus.

Alongside his passion for painting, Müller also took pleasure in musical improvisation. He learnt to play the violin at an early age, played banjo in a band called Burgkapelle and later played mouth organ, together with his friend and former fellow student Helmut Schröder.

To fund his training at Burg Giebichenstein, Müller was forced to interrupt his studies for lengthy periods on several occasions. From 1920 to 1922 and from 1924 to 1925, he worked as a painter in the Leuna works. Here, in 1921, he experienced the communist-led revolt known as the March Action at first hand. He spent the period of economic depression in 1923 and 1924 on the “waltz”. In Göttingen, he worked as a stage painter at the Deutsches Theater. His journeying took him to Southern Germany, where he found work in Kochel am See on the construction of the Walchensee Hydroelectric Power Station. In Munich, he visited the art collections in the city's two major galleries, the Alte Pinakothek and the Neue Pinakothek).

In 1929, he sat and passed the painter's trade examination with the stage decorator O. Möllhoff in Halle.

Professional and family life 1930–1945 

Upon completion of his studies, in 1930 Müller entered employment in the paint factory at the Technische Chemikalien- und Compagnie GmbH in Halle. He remained there until 1941 as a laboratory technician and departmental manager.

 In 1936, Müller married Senta-Luise Demmer. In the same year, their daughter Thekla was born. In 1937 they had a son, also called Otto.

During the Second World War, Müller served from 1938 to 1940 in the German defensive line known as the Westwall.

From 1941 to 1945, he worked as a draughtsman at the Siebel aircraft plant in Halle and was thereby exempt from military service for the rest of the war.

Professional and family life 1945–1963 

On July 1, 1945, Müller began working as a self-employed painter and graphic designer in Halle. In 1946, he became a member of the Artists Association of the Democratic Republic of Germany – known in German as Verband Bildender Künstler (VBK) – which had been set up by Richard Horn (1898–1989) and Karl Völker. During this period, Müller earned his living by composing advertising materials, cinema posters for example.

In 1947, the family moved to 14 Fischer von Erlach Straße. This was part of a complex of barracks originally built as a military hospital but now partly occupied by artists and their families. The Müllers shared their barracks with the following artists and their families: Meinolf Splett (born 1911), Fritz Stehwien (born 1914), Clemens Kindling (1916–1992), Mrs Braun (on the recommendation of the architect Hanns Hopp (1890–1971)), Kurt Völker (brother of Karl Völker). The following artists lived in the neighbouring barracks: Richard Horn, Karl-Erich Müller (1917–1998), Herbert Lange and Helmut Schröder. Like his friends Helmut Schröder, Fritz Freitag (1915–1977) and Karl-Erich Müller, Otto Müller was a member of a Halle-based group of artists under the aegis of Fritz Baust (1912–1982), known as Die Fähre (The Ferryboat - 1947–1949). Müller contributed to the exhibitions organised by die Fähre with landscapes, drawings of animals and nudes. It was not until 1950 however that Müller devoted himself to the workshop themes intensively propagated at this time by other Fähre artists such as Karl-Erich Müller, Herbert Lange and Willi Sitte (born 1921).

In March 1948, he took part in an exhibition at the Henning Gallery in Halle, together with Charles Crodel, Kurt Bunge and Karl Rödel (1907–1982). His contributions to the exhibition caused Richard Horn to describe Otto Müller as “the most interesting of the four artists in the exhibition” in the introduction to the exhibition catalogue.

With three graphic works from 1947, Müller was one of just two artists from Halle (together with Willi Sitte) to be represented at the Gesamtdeutsche Graphik-Ausstellung (German Graphic Exhibition) organised by the German Cultural Council in Munich and held in the State Gallery and the Lenbach Gallery. One of the most prominent members of the jury was Charles Crodel, who had been a lecturer at the Academy of Fine Arts in Munich since 1952.

In 1954, Müller moved with his family to the first new accommodation built in Halle since the end of the war, in Stalinallee 57b. This was later renamed as 179 and – since 1990 – as Merseburger Straße 127.

From 1951 to about 1964, Müller worked in workshops in agriculture, mining and industry for various customers or as part of work placements organised by the Artists Association of the Democratic Republic of Germany. In 1951 and 1953, he produced graphic works for the Machine and Tractor Station (MTS) in Volkstedt near Eisleben. In 1955, Müller worked on agricultural themes at the agricultural collective (LPG) in Eismannsdorf. In 1957, he produced tempera works in the Gronau salt and potash shaft in Bernburg. In 1958, he spent a period working in the engineering works in Halle, where he produced an oil painting known as „Der Maschinenformer“ (the engine builder), now owned by the Moritzburg foundation at the Kunstmuseum des Landes Sachsen-Anhalt (State Art Museum of Saxony-Anhalt) in Halle. In 1959, Müller worked at the Karsdorf cement works. His maize triptych, produced in 1962, was refused. The reason for this could be that the dominant depiction of maize in three stages of ripeness – in spring, summer and autumn – did not leave enough room for a depiction of agriculture scenes. In 1964, Müller worked on the Free German Trade Union (FDGB) project “Junge Tierzüchterin” (young farmer) at the agricultural collective in Merbitz.
In the 1950s,  Müller paid regular visits to the artist couple Herbert Kitzel (1928–1978) und Mareile Kitzel at Talstraße 23 (now a gallery), as well as Hilmar and Heidi Manthey. It was here that he met Otto Möhwald (b. 1933) in 1957. From 1958 to 1959, they worked together on projects between Amendorf and Buna and in Dobis near Wettin or using portrait models in the Möhwalds' apartment.

From 1959 to 1966, Müller was a member of the section executive of the VBK Halle. While exercising this function, he initiated visits to fellow artists' studios. From the 1960s onwards, he met regularly with other colleagues to do nude drawings in the Moritzburg. In 1963, he led an educational trip to Prague, together with Karl-Erich Müller and Gerhard Geyer (1907–1989).

Later works 1963–1979 
On the occasion of his 65th birthday in 1963, Müller was awarded the Art Award of the City of Halle for his lifetime artistic accomplishments and for his tile paintings in the “frohe Zukunft” school. An exhibition of his works was also held to mark this occasion at the State Gallery in Moritzburg, now the State Museum. In the preface to the catalogue, Heinz Schönemann, then the director of the State Gallery, wrote “A pupil himself of Burg Giebichenstein, he could be described as a silent master of the artists of Halle, as so much of their work essentially originated with him. His rich imagination, his thoroughness and his technical knowledge, his eye for the pleasant things in our life – all these have always been an inspiration for his colleagues.”

Although Müller never took up a teaching post at an art academy, his life's work led many colleagues and friends to see him as the “old master of Halle painting” (Ingrid Schulze 1969). Two professors at the Burg Giebichstein art academy for example, Karl Müller (1888–1972) and Willi Sitte showed their students graphic works by Müller. From the late 1950s onwards, young people with artistic interests sought contact with Müller, resulting in intensive discussions and joint studies of professional artists. These include Falko Warmt (b. 1938), with Müller from 1960 to 1963, Karl-Heinz Köhler (b. 1937) and Wolfgang Grunwald. What they all had in common was that none of them had studied directly at the art academy, all exercising unrelated professions, one being a chemist, one a cartographer and the other a teacher.

Upon retirement, Müller no longer needed to take on assignments in order to earn a living. From the latter half of the 1960s, he dedicated himself to depictions of plants and, in particular, to crayon portraits of girls. Following the birth of his granddaughter Claudia in 1967, he produced a substantial number of baby portraits in oil. In the 1970s, Otto Müller and fellow artist Karl-Erich Müller often worked together on sketches in Halle, Merseburg and the Saalkreis.

These studies resulted in several hundred drawings and watercolours, documenting various condemned buildings in Halle's old town. A large number of graphic urban landscapes are now kept in the city archives in Halle.

Müller's circle of friends and rising young artists from Halle at this time included Wolfgang Barton (b. 1932), Bernhard Michel (b. 1939), Bernt Wilke (1b. 943) and Fotis Zaprasis (b. 1940). In 1977, the State Gallery on the Hansering in Halle opened with a sales exhibition of works by Müller. The interest was so great that almost all exhibited works were sold.

On December 9, 1979, Müller died as a result of a serious lung complaint in the Carl von Basedow clinic in Merseburg.

Works 
Müller mastered a number of different graphical and artistic techniques:
 Drawing: With pencil, crayon, and felt-tip pens, sanguine drawings, sepia drawings (using a quill), ink drawings (using a paintbrush), Watercolor painting
 Painting: Tempera, wax painting, Oil painting
 His own combinations of some of these techniques
Throughout his career, Müller produced images of people (especially of portraits and nudes), plants, animals and landscapes. He became known at an early stage for his pictures of flowers and grass, and was often referred to as “Flower” Müller or “Grass” Müller to distinguish him from other artists with the same surname. Post 1945, he spent several periods working intensively on certain themes:
 1947–1949: Animals, mainly as drawings
 1951–1964: Technology, industry and agriculture
 1963–1973: Portraits (girls, babies, children, self-portraits), mainly in wax
 1973–1979: Urban landscapes, mainly in watercolour and tempera
Müller's work included subject paintings and more abstract art. He admitted readily that his earlier abstract works were mere imitations of other artists, but the abstract works he produced in the post-war period were far more original He provided a glimpse of his view of art in an interview with Christine Mücklisch: „…my intention though is to paint from nature, because there is more to see there than I can imagine.“
Müller's works were shown in many exhibitions during his lifetime. The following is a selection of these:
 1928: Exhibition of Müller's work from his school days at the Roter Turm in Halle
 1934: Represented at the exhibition “Hallesche Kunst” at the Anhaltischen Kunstverein in  Dessau
 1939: Prize winner in the „Schafft schöne Heimatkunst“ competition in Halle
 1946: Represented at the first German art exhibition after the Second World War in Berlin
 1948: Represented at the exhibition “Die Welt im Schleier der Farbe: Carl Crodel, Kurt Bunge, Otto Müller, Karl Rödel” at the Galerie Henning in Halle
 1948: Represented at the exhibition “Das Aktbild” at the Galerie Marktschlößchen in Halle, organised by the Halle artists group known as “Die Fähre”
 1949: Exhibition of animal drawings and paintings by Müller, organised by Die Fähre
 1951: Exhibition of graphic studies in the Machine and Tractor Station (MTS) Volkstedt
 1956: Represented at the Gesamtdeutsche Graphik-Ausstellung (German Graphic Exhibition) organised by the German Cultural Council in Munich and held in the State Gallery and the Lenbach Gallery
 1963–1964: Exhibition of his works from throughout his lifetime at the State Gallery in Moritzburg on the occasion of his 65th birthday
 1967, 1972, 1977: Participated in art exhibitions of the German Federal Republic in Dresden
 1968: Exhibition at the kleine Galerie in Halle on the occasion of his 70th birthday
 From 1969: Represented in the regional art exhibitions
 1976: Exhibition in the Carl von Basedow clinic in Merseburg
 1977: Opening of the State Gallery on the Hansering in Halle with exhibition of works by Müller.
 1977: Exhibition in Galerie am Sachsenplatz in Leipzig
 1978–1979: Exhibition in the Galerie Marktschlößchen in Halle on the occasion of this 80th birthday
 1979–1980: “Kunst aus Halle” (Kunst from Halle) exhibition in Galerie “Spektrum” in Chemnitz (known at the time as Karl-Marx-Stadt)
 1979–1980: Represented at the “Kunst aus der DDR, Bezirk Halle” (Art from the GDR, region Halle) exhibition in the Kunstverein Hannover

Sources 
The written documents from Müller’s estate are stored in the Sächsische Landesbibliothek – Staats- und Universitätsbibliothek Dresden (SLUB Dresden), Mscr. Dresd. App. 2391, 1–512.

Further reading

External links 
 
 Paintings by Otto Müller at museum-digital.de 

20th-century German painters
20th-century German male artists
German male painters
People from Halle (Saale)
1898 births
1979 deaths